César Jorge Gérico (1901 – unknown) was a sailor from Argentina, who represented his country at the 1924 Summer Olympics in Le Havre, France.

References

Sources
 
 

Argentine male sailors (sport)
Sailors at the 1924 Summer Olympics – 8 Metre
Olympic sailors of Argentina
1901 births
Year of death missing